Margaret of Austria (25 December 1584 – 3 October 1611) was Queen of Spain and Portugal by her marriage to King Philip III & II.

Life
Margaret was the daughter of Archduke Charles II of Austria and Maria Anna of Bavaria and thus the paternal granddaughter of the Holy Roman Emperor Ferdinand I.  Her elder brother was the Archduke Ferdinand, who succeeded as Emperor in 1619.  Two of her sisters, Anna and Constance, through their subsequent marriages to King Sigismund III Vasa, became Queens of Poland.

Queen of Spain

Margaret married Philip III of Spain, her first-cousin, once-removed, on 18 April 1599.

She became a very influential figure at her husband's court. Philip had an "affectionate, close relationship" with Margaret, and paid her additional attention after she bore him a son in 1605.

Margaret was also a great patron of the arts. She was considered by contemporaries to be a very pious Catholic and "astute and very skillful" in her political dealings.

Alongside the Empress Maria, widow of Holy Roman Emperor Maximilian II, and the latter's daughter Archduchess Margaret, who lived as a nun in Madrid, Queen Margaret formed a circle of women wielding considerable influence over the king. They emphasised Spain's status as a Catholic power acting in the interest of Catholic Europe and also highlighted the unity of the House of Habsburg. They were successful, for example, in convincing Philip to provide financial support to Holy Roman Emperor Ferdinand II.

The pro-Austrian camp at the Spanish court was opposed by the Duke of Lerma, the King's chief minister, who argued that Spain should pursue her own course of action independently of religious or dynastic ties. Queen Margaret was "melancholic" and unhappy about the influence of the Duke, whom she considered corrupt, over her husband, and continually fought him for influence over the king. In this conflict, she was supported by her favourite Mariana de San José, prioress of the Monasteria la Encarnación, her husband's confessor Father Luis de Aliaga, and her daughter Maria Anna's confessor, the Franciscan friar Juan de Santa María - who was felt by contemporaries to have an excessive influence over the King at the end of his life. The Duke of Lerma was eventually removed from power in 1618, though only after Margaret's death.

Margaret died while giving birth to her youngest child, Alfonso. Her husband never remarried and died ten years later.

Issue
Margaret and Philip had eight children:
Anna Maria Mauricia (22 September 1601 – 20 January 1666), queen of France
Maria (1 February 1603 -1 March 1603)
Philip (8 April 1605 – 17 September 1665), king of Spain
Maria Anna (18 August 1606 – 13 May 1646), empress of the Holy Roman Empire
Charles (14 September 1607 – 30 July 1632)
Ferdinand (16 May 1609 – 9 November 1641), a cardinal
Margaret (24 May 1610 – 11 March 1617)
Alphonse Maurice (22 September 1611 – 16 September 1612)

Ancestors

Depiction in media
Margaret of Austria is portrayed by Elena Rivera in the Spanish TV show El Ministerio del Tiempo.

Actress Viveca Lindfors portrayed Margaret in the 1948 Hollywood movie Adventures of Don Juan.

Bibliography

Magdalena S. Sánchez, Pious and Political Images of a Habsburg Woman at the Court of Philip III (1598–1621). in: Magdalena S. Sánchez and Alain Saint-Saëns (ed.), Spanish women in the golden age: images and realities. Greenwood Publishing Group (1996).

References

|-

1584 births
1611 deaths
Austrian princesses
Burials in the Pantheon of Kings at El Escorial
Daughters of monarchs
Deaths in childbirth
Duchesses of Burgundy
Countesses of Holland
Duchesses of Milan
17th-century House of Habsburg
Portuguese queens consort
Royal consorts of Naples
Royal consorts of Sicily
Spanish royal consorts
16th-century Spanish women
17th-century Spanish women